The Qingjing Farm, also known as Cingjing Farm, is a tourist attraction farm in Ren'ai Township, Nantou County, Taiwan.

History
The farm was established on 20 February 1961 as the settling place for the demobilized soldiers and their dependents who were listed in the armed forces.

Geology
The farm is located at an altitude of 1,748 meters above sea level and spans over an area of 760 hectares. The average daily temperature is 16°C with daily variation of around 2―5°C.

Facilities
 Tourist Center
 Green Green Grasslands
 Small Swiss Garden
 Recreation Center
 Shoushan Park
 Guest House
 Stock Nurturing Center

Transportation
The farm is accessible by bus from Taichung TRA station or Taichung HSR station.

See also
 List of tourist attractions in Taiwan

References

External links

 

1961 establishments in Taiwan
Buildings and structures completed in 1961
Buildings and structures in Nantou County
Farms in Taiwan
Tourist attractions in Nantou County